A lectern is a reading desk with a slanted top, on which documents or books are placed as support for reading aloud, as in a scripture reading, lecture, or sermon. A lectern is usually attached to a stand or affixed to some other form of support. To facilitate eye contact and improve posture when facing an audience, lecterns may have adjustable height and slant. People reading from a lectern, called lectors, generally do so while standing.

In pre-modern usage, the word lectern was used to refer specifically to the "reading desk or stand ... from which the Scripture lessons (lectiones) ... are chanted or read." One 1905 dictionary states that "the term is properly applied only to the class mentioned [church book stands] as independent of the pulpit." By the 1920s, however, the term was being used in a broader sense; for example, in reference to a memorial service in Carnegie Hall, it was stated that "the lectern from which the speakers talked was enveloped in black."

Academic use

Lecterns used in academia—generally in seminar rooms and lecture theatres—may have certain features that common lecterns lack, based on the technological sophistication of the venue. These features usually include a microphone stand, audio-visual controls, sometimes even an integrated computer and recording system. Lecterns of this sort are generally attached or integrated into a large desk, as the amount of support material tends to be larger in academic contexts than in straightforward public talks.

Religious use

Christian 

In the Christian Church, the lectern is usually the stand on which the Bible rests and from which the "lessons" (scripture passages, often selected from a lectionary) are read during the service. The lessons may be read or chanted by a priest, deacon, minister, or layperson, depending upon the liturgical traditions of the community. The lectern is normally set in front of the pews, so that the reader or speaker faces the congregation.

Lecterns are often made of wood. They may be either fixed in place or portable. A lectern differs from a pulpit, the latter being used for sermons. Churches that have both a lectern and a pulpit will often place them on opposite sides. The lectern will generally be smaller than the pulpit, and both may be adorned with antipendia in the color of the liturgical season.

In monastic churches and cathedrals, a separate lectern is commonly set in the centre of the choir. Originally this would have carried the antiphonal book, for use by the cantor or precentor leading the singing of the divine office. Lecterns often take the form of eagle lecterns to symbolise John the Apostle. Especially in North America and Great Britain lecterns are sometimes made as 'angel lecterns'.

In the Eastern Orthodox and Eastern Catholic Churches, a lectern on which icons or the Gospel Book are placed for veneration is called an analogion. It may also be used for reading from liturgical books during the divine services.

Jewish 

Because the Torah scrolls are generally large, the central feature of the bimah in a synagogue is a table large enough to hold an open Torah along with a tikkun or Chumash (reference books used to check the reading). In some synagogues, this table may resemble a large lectern. The Hebrew term for this article of furniture is amud.

In traditional yeshivas and some synagogues, students and members of the congregation may use small desks called . These closely resemble conventional lecterns, and indeed, one  may be used as a lectern by the hazzan leading the service. Each study group in a yeshivah may have its own  and in some older synagogues individual members of the congregation may have their own .

Traditional  frequently incorporate a locker under the desktop where prayer books and study material may be locked when not in use, and many feature a footrest for comfort during extended study sessions or standing prayers.

See also 
 Dais
 Podium
 Rehal (book rest)

References

Bibliography

External links

Academia
Pulpits
Reading of religious texts